= Yang Tianyong =

Criminal gang leader

- Died: November 2000 (aged 41)
- Cause of death: Executed
- Known for: Feeding murder victims to pigs; keeping detailed notes of his own crimes
- Criminal charges: Criminal collusion, 19 murders, robbery, robbery of guns and ammunition
- Penalty: Death

Details
- Victims: 19
- Span of crimes: 1997–2000
- Country: People's Republic of China
- Location: Kunming
- Injured: 1
- Weapons: Knives, guns
- Date apprehended: June 2000

Yang Tianyong (Chinese: 杨天勇; executed November 2000) was the leader of a criminal gang operating in Kunming, People's Republic of China, from 16 April 1997 to 31 May 2000.

After losing his job with Kunming's railway police, Yang stole police uniforms and formed a gang that stole cars by methods that included flagging them down and killing the drivers. He kept detailed notes of his crimes, which included a "practice" killing for which a pedestrian was abducted. His gang stole 24 motor vehicles valued at over 3.7 million yuan. They killed nineteen people. Yang used the proceeds of criminal activities to buy a pig farm and disposed of some victims' bodies by feeding them to his pigs and his three wolfhounds.

The gang was traced because they continued to use a mobile phone taken from their last victim, the police officer Zhu Kun, murdered on 31 May 2000.

After his arrest in 2000, Yang confessed to the 1998 murder of two police officers, one man and one woman, for which the woman's husband, Du Peiwu, had been sentenced to death in 1999. The sentence had not yet been carried out, and Du Peiwu was released after 26 months in prison.

Seven gang members were found guilty of collusion to commit robberies, murder, and robbery of guns and ammunition. Yang was reported to be 41 years old at the time of his execution.
